Phoenix Goodyear Airport  (formerly Goodyear Municipal Airport) is a public airport  southwest of Goodyear, in Maricopa County, Arizona, United States.

It was built during World War II as a naval air facility, NAF Litchfield Park, then upgraded to naval air station status and renamed NAS Litchfield Park. Its primary role after the end of World War II was storage and preservation of obsolete or excess U.S. Navy, U.S. Marine Corps and U.S. Coast Guard aircraft. In 1968, all Department of Defense and U.S. Coast Guard aircraft preservation and storage was consolidated at the Military Aircraft Storage and Disposition Center (MASDC) at Davis-Monthan AFB in Tucson and NAS Litchfield Park was slated for closure.

Following the closure of NAS Litchfield Park in 1968, the city of Phoenix purchased the airport as a general aviation reliever airport for Phoenix Sky Harbor International Airport. The airport is not served by any airlines. The airport is, however, a major keep and maintenance spot, and the aircraft of many airlines, both domestic and international, can be spotted there.

Phoenix-Goodyear Airport is a Superfund site due to a number of soil and groundwater contaminants from its time as a military installation.

NAS Litchfield Park

Facilities
GYR has one asphalt runway and one concrete helipad:

 Runway 3/21 measuring 
 Helipad H1, measuring 

In 2020 the airport had 79,599 aircraft operations, average 218 per day: 94% general aviation, <1% airline, 1% military and 4% air taxi. 215 aircraft were based at the airport: 183 single engine, 6 multi-engine, 19 jet, 6 military, and 1 helicopter.

Resident companies 

The airfield is home to several companies offering aircraft maintenance and commercial pilot training:
 AerSale, Inc. operates a maintenance facility on the airfield which comprises maintenance, storage and disposal. The northern side of the airfield is used for storage and many Boeing 737, Airbus A340 and Boeing 747s are visible from the road as they await their fate.
 Airline Training Center Arizona (ATCA) was the training facility for the Lufthansa Flight Training of German Lufthansa Airlines. Basic flight training for German Air Force student pilots was also conducted in Grob G 120 aircraft.
 Oxford Aviation Academy (OAA) is the US name for Oxford Aviation Academy, a British company specializing in training airline pilots for United Kingdom, British Airways and other European airlines. OAA moved to Falcon Field in October 2013 and is no longer based at KGYR.

Both flight training schools, while regulated by the FAA and operating under their regulations, train students to JAA requirements as required for Europe.

From 2014 CTC Wings aviation academy started to use the airport as training facility in addition to its center in Hamilton, New Zealand.

Operational statistics

Through December 31, 2020.

Gallery

References

External links 

 Phoenix Goodyear Airport (official site)
 Phoenix Goodyear Airport (GYR) at Arizona DOT airport directory
 Air Traffic Activity System (ATADS) (FAA Statistical Data)
 
 

Airports in Maricopa County, Arizona
Post-World War II aircraft storage facilities
Aircraft boneyards
Superfund sites in Arizona
Goodyear, Arizona
World War II airfields in the United States
Closed installations of the United States Navy